Bondarev (masculine) or Bondareva (feminine) is a Russian surname, derived from the word "бондарь" (cooper). Notable people with the surname include:

Timofei Bondarev (1820 – 1898), Russian philosopher
Aleksei Bondarev (born 1987), Russian footballer
Alexei Bondarev (born 1983), Kazakhstani ice hockey player
Arseny Bondarev (born 1985), Russian ice hockey player
Boris Bondarev Russian diplomat
Konstantin Bondarev (born 1972), Ukrainian politician
Stanislav Bondarev (born 1968), Russian footballer
Viktor Bondarev (born 1959), Russian Air Force general
Vitaliy Bondarev (born 1985), Ukrainian footballer
Yuri Bondarev (1924–2020), Russian writer
Olga Bondareva(1937-1991), Russian mathematician and economist

See also
Igors Bondarevs

Russian-language surnames